Eric Kerfoot (31 July 1924 – 4 March 1980) was an English footballer. He was a long-serving wing-half for Leeds United and Chesterfield in the 1950s.

Kerfoot was signed from non-league Stalybridge Celtic for £3,000 in 1949. An excellent and enterprising wing-half, he was one of the most consistent Leeds players, being ever-present in four seasons including the 1955–56 side that won promotion to Division 1 in 1956. He also captained Leeds in 1954–55. In total, Kerfoot made 349 appearances for Leeds, and scored 10 goals.

Kerfoot eventually left for Chesterfield in 1959, and spent one season there before retiring from the game.

References 

 Eric Kerfoot, Post War English & Scottish Football League A–Z Player's Transfer Database

1924 births
1980 deaths
Footballers from Ashton-under-Lyne
Association football wing halves
English footballers
Leeds United F.C. players
Chesterfield F.C. players
English Football League players
Stalybridge Celtic F.C. players